Shalgam is a traditional salad from Kazakhstan and Kyrgyzstan. It is made from radishes (shalgam), sweet Bulgarian bell pepper, carrots, onions, garlic and spices.

See also
 Kazakh cuisine
 Kyrgyz cuisine
 List of salads
 Şalgam (a Turkish beverage)

References

Kazakhstani cuisine
Kyrgyz cuisine
National dishes
Salads